The Fuyu Oriental Crown, also known as The Glory Tower, is a residential skyscraper located in Xitun District, Taichung, Taiwan. As of December 2020, it is the tallest residential skyscraper in Taichung, the 7th tallest building in Taichung and 25th tallest in Taiwan.

See also 
 List of tallest buildings in Taiwan
 List of tallest buildings in Taichung
 Taichung's 7th Redevelopment Zone

References

2015 establishments in Taiwan
Residential skyscrapers in Taiwan
Skyscrapers in Taichung
Taichung's 7th Redevelopment Zone
Apartment buildings in Taiwan
Neoclassical architecture in Taiwan